Yamnoye is a rural locality (a selo) and the administrative center of Yamenskoye Rural Settlement, Ramonsky District, Voronezh Oblast, Russia. The population was  2,309 as of 2010. There are 180 streets.

Geography 
Yamnoye is located 30 km southwest of Ramon (the district's administrative centre) by road. Novopodkletnoye is the nearest rural locality.

References 

Rural localities in Ramonsky District